Martin Euclid Thompson (1786–1877) was an American architect and artist prolific in nineteenth-century New York City, and a co-founder of the National Academy of Design.

Originally trained as a carpenter, he had been a partner of Ithiel Town and went on to become one of the founders of the National Academy of Design. Thompson's symmetrical structure of brick in English bond, with headers every fifth course, presents a central block in the manner of a fortified gatehouse flanked by half-octagonal towers. The carpentry doorframe speaks of its purpose with an American eagle displayed between stacks of cannonballs over the door, and crossed sabers and stacked pikes represented in flanking panels.

Works
Second Branch Bank of the United States (1824), now preserved as a facade in the American Wing of the Metropolitan Museum of Art
Merchants Exchange Building (New York City), destroyed in the Great Fire of New York, December 1835.
Naval Hospital, Brooklyn Navy Yard, Brooklyn (1830–38)
His Greek Revival Colles Mansion (1838), Morristown, New Jersey, is now The Kellogg Club
The Admiral's House (Governor's Island) (1843), Governors Island, New York City, landmarked July 24, 1972.
The Arsenal (1847–1851), 830 Fifth Avenue, New York City
Sailors Snug Harbor, Staten Island, is now attributed to Minard Lafever(Not Correct - Builder was Samuel Thomson of Inwood, NY)

References
Notes

External links
Art and the empire city: New York, 1825-1861, an exhibition catalog from The Metropolitan Museum of Art (fully available online as PDF), which contains material on Thompson (see index)
 Martin E. Thompson architectural drawings and papers, 1822-1861. Held by the Department of Drawings & Archives, Avery Architectural & Fine Arts Library, Columbia University

1786 births
1877 deaths
19th-century American architects
American civil engineers
Greek Revival architects
Federalist architects
Architects from New York City
Defunct architecture firms based in New York City
Engineers from New York City